George Buxton Bower (18 June 1884 – 5 February 1964) was an Australian rules footballer who played with South Melbourne in the Victorian Football League (VFL).

Family
His older brother, Harold Carlyle Bower (1878–1954) also played for South Melbourne.

Football

South Melbourne (VFL)
Bower made his debut in round one, 1909, against Geelong, at Corio Oval on 1 May 1909.

He was a member of a premiership team in his very first season, playing as a centreman in the 1909 VFL Grand Final. In 1912, South Melbourne made another grand final, but Bower didn't play as he had received a four-week suspension in the semi final, for striking Essendon's Fred Baring.

He played his last senior match, against Geelong, on 2 May 1914, in which he was one of the best on the ground.

Training Units Team (AIF)
While serving overseas he played for the (losing) Australian Training Units team in the famous "Pioneer Exhibition Game" of Australian Rules football, held in London, in October 1916. A news film was taken at the match.

Military service
Bower's career ended when he enlisted in the First AIF; he served overseas with the 13th Light Horse Regiment

See also
 1916 Pioneer Exhibition Game

Footnotes

References

 Holmesby, Russell & Main, Jim (2007), The Encyclopedia of AFL Footballers, BAS Publishing. 
 Richardson, N. (2016) The Game of Their Lives, Pan Macmillan Australia: Sydney. 
 Photographs: second from left, front row, in :File:1909_South_Melbourne_Football_Club.jpg, centre of second row, at Group portrait of officers of the 60th Battalion (C01871), collection of the Australian War Memorial; and third from left, back row, in Group portrait of officers of the 60th Battalion (E01426), collection of the Australian War Memorial.
 Pioneer Exhibition Game Australian Football: in aid of British and French Red Cross Societies: 3rd Australian Division v. Australian Training Units at Queen's Club, West Kensington, on Saturday, October 28th, 1916, at 3pm, Wightman & Co., (London), 1919.
 Melbourne (8.5) Beat Geelong (6.3), The Age, (Monday, 3 May 1909), p.5.
 Club Gossip, The Argus, (Friday, 11 June 1909), p.9.
 South Melbourne Going Strong, The Argus, (Monday, 14 June 1909), p.5.
 Football, The Mercury, (Wednesday, 6 October 1909), p.8.
 Football, The (Adelaide) Register, (Monday, 11 October 1909), p.5.
 Observer, "South Melbourne Wins", The Argus, (Monday, 4 October 1909), p.6.
 St.Kilda's Form, The Argus, (Monday, 6 September 1909), p.5.
  Second Semi-Final, The Argus, (Monday, 20 September 1909), p.6.
 Fighting for a Final, The Argus, (Monday 27 September 1909), p.6.
 South Melbourne's Superiority, The Argus, (Monday, 27 April 1914), p.6.
 Presentations to Footballers, The Argus, (Wednesday, 13 October 1915), p.10.
 First World War Embarkation Roll: Private George Buxton Bower (1446), collection of the Australian War Memorial.
 First World War Nominal Roll: Lieutenant George Buxton Bower (1446), collection of the Australian War Memorial.
 First World War Service Record: Lieutenant George Buxton Bower (1446), National Archives of Australia.

External links
 
 

1884 births
Australian rules footballers from Melbourne
Sydney Swans players
Sydney Swans Premiership players
Participants in "Pioneer Exhibition Game" (London, 28 October 1916)
Leopold Football Club (MJFA) players
Australian military personnel of World War I
1964 deaths
One-time VFL/AFL Premiership players
People from South Melbourne
Military personnel from Melbourne